Kharlzada Kasrat Rai is a Pakistani two-time holder of the World Record for Peace Walks. On October 1 he walked 6387 km to reach Mecca from Karachi to perform Haj. He started his walk on June 7.

Past Walks
In 2013, he walked 6,387 kilometers between Karachi and Makkah , a journey is completed in 114 days.
In 2007, he walked 1,999 kilometres between Khyber and Karachi in Pakistan, a journey he completed in 85 days.
In 2009, he walked 327 kilometres from Lahore to Islamabad in 14 days.

References

Living people
Pakistani activists
Year of birth missing (living people)